Stanhope-Marshfield is a provincial electoral district for the Legislative Assembly of Prince Edward Island, Canada. It was created prior to the 2019 election from parts of the former districts Tracadie-Hillsborough Park and York-Oyster Bed.

The riding consists of rural communities north-east of Charlottetown, including Brackley Beach, Marshfield, and Stanhope.

Members

Election results

Stanhope-Marshfield, 2019–present

Referendum and plebiscite results

2019 electoral reform referendum
The 2019 Prince Edward Island electoral reform referendum was held on April 23, 2019.

References

External links
Elections PEI: District 8 Stanhope-Marshfield

Politics of Charlottetown
Prince Edward Island provincial electoral districts